Gianfranco Bersani (2 January 1919 – 19 December 1965) was an Italian basketball player. He competed in the men's tournament at the 1948 Summer Olympics.

References

1919 births
1965 deaths
Italian men's basketball players
Olympic basketball players of Italy
Basketball players at the 1948 Summer Olympics
Sportspeople from Bologna